The Fellowship of the Royal Society of Victoria is an historically recent college made up of about 30 Australian scientists and proponents of scientific literacy.

Fellows judged by their peers to have made an exceptional contribution to their field and/or to the public appreciation of science may be elected to Fellowship of the Society. Fellows are often denoted using the post-nominal FRSV (Fellow of the Royal Society of Victoria).

Fellows are appointed for life; this table also contains deceased fellows.

Fellows

References
The Royal Society of Victoria. 

 
Royal Society of Victoria
Royal Society of Victoria
Fellows of the Royal Society of Victoria